Pioneer Heroes is a 2015 Russian drama film directed by Natalia Kudryashova. It was screened in the Panorama section of the 65th Berlin International Film Festival. In December 2014, the film had been named best work-in-progress at the "coproduction village" of Les Arcs Film Festival.

Cast
 Natalia Kudryashova		
 Darya Moroz
 Alexei Mizin
 Varya Shablakova
 Sima Vybornova
 Nikita Yakovlev
 Yury Alexandrovich Kuznetsov
 Aleksandr Userdin

References

External links
  (CTB Film Company)
 
 Alpha Violet (International sales agent - official press kit dossier)
 Film.ru (Russian)

2015 films
2015 drama films
Russian drama films
2010s Russian-language films